Futurama is the third album by the Japanese indie rock band Supercar. The album's name is a portmanteau of the words "future" and "panorama."  Musically, its electronic experimentation marked a significant shift for a group whose music two years earlier had been characterized primarily as guitar rock.

Futurama was released on November 22, 2000 and it reached the 21st place on the Oricon Albums Chart.

Track listing

References

External links

2000 albums
Supercar (band) albums
Ki/oon Records albums